Charles French (21 October 1851 – 27 October 1925) was a politician in Ireland, serving as Member of the Parliament of the United Kingdom.

The eldest son of Charles French, 3rd Baron de Freyne by his wife Catherine Maree, French was born before his parents' marriage on 17 May 1854 and so was not eligible to succeed to the title of Baron de Freyne, which passed to his younger brother, Arthur, in 1868. He married Constance Eleanor Chichester on 21 January 1880.

French was elected to represent County Roscommon in a Parliamentary by-election, 24 June 1873, and held the seat until the 1880 general election.

He was High Sheriff of Roscommon in 1887.

References

External links 

 

1851 births
1925 deaths
Politicians from County Roscommon
19th-century Irish people
High Sheriffs of Roscommon
Members of the Parliament of the United Kingdom for County Roscommon constituencies (1801–1922)
UK MPs 1868–1874
UK MPs 1874–1880